Major McKinley Hillard (October 23, 1896 – June 24, 1977) was a Virginia politician and judge from Chesapeake, Virginia.

Early life and career
Hillard was born in Morgan County, Tennessee on October 23, 1896.  His family moved to the Deep Creek borough of Norfolk County, Virginia (now the city of Chesapeake) in 1907.

Hillard served in the U.S. Army in World War I, after which he attended the College of William and Mary and the T.C. Williams Law School at the University of Richmond.  He practiced law in Portsmouth, Virginia beginning in 1926.  He married Mary Frances "Merle" Cherry (1895-1989) in about 1921.  They had a son and a daughter.

Political career
Hillard and was elected to the Virginia House of Delegates as a Democrat in 1927, representing Norfolk County and the City of South Norfolk and he was reelected in 1929.  In 1931, he was elected to the Virginia Senate representing the 3rd District which he held until he resigned in 1954 upon being appointed Circuit Court Clerk for Norfolk County.

Career on the bench
Hillard was appointed a Circuit Court judge in 1961.  He used his political savvy and was instrumental in the merger of Norfolk County with South Norfolk to form the city of Chesapeake in 1963.

He retired from the bench in 1971, but continued serving the community in a variety of ways, such as at Deep Creek Baptist Church and the Deep Creek Ruritan Club.

Death and memorials
The Major Hillard library is a public library in the City of Chesapeake that was named in Hillard's honor.  Hillard died in June 1977 in Chesapeake, Virginia.

References

External links
 
 

1896 births
1977 deaths
Democratic Party members of the Virginia House of Delegates
Democratic Party Virginia state senators
Politicians from Chesapeake, Virginia
College of William & Mary alumni
University of Richmond alumni
Baptists from Tennessee
Virginia lawyers
People from Morgan County, Tennessee
United States Army personnel of World War I
20th-century American judges
Baptists from Virginia
Virginia circuit court judges